Schwarzenbach is a town in the Wiener Neustadt-Land district, Lower Austria, Austria.  48.22 percent of the municipality is forested. The area is divided into two districts: Schwarzenbach and Schwarzenbach (Zerstreut), the latter comprising the scattered settlements around the main village. There are 33 non-agricultural companies. 463 persons are employed. The activity rate in 2001 was 41.34%.

Population

History
An old Celtic settlement dating back to the 1st and the 2nd centuries has been excavated since 1992.  The findings there show that the community was of great social and political importance.

References

Rosalia Mountains
Bucklige Welt
Cities and towns in Wiener Neustadt-Land District